Iluka is a small village at the mouth of the Clarence River in north-eastern New South Wales, Australia. It is situated directly across the river from the resort town of Yamba. At the 2016 census, Iluka had a population of 1,718 people. The town's name is derived from an Aboriginal word meaning "near the sea".

It has long beaches on the ocean side of the river. As Iluka is a popular tourist destination its population increases slightly in the holiday season with many Gold Coasters in the summer and Victorians in the winter.

Nature

Iluka Nature Reserve

The area hosts a World Heritage-listed littoral rainforest, one of the last remaining littoral rainforests in the Southern Hemisphere, containing many different plant species ranging from coastal dune species to tropical rainforest species. The Iluka rainforest has a vast range of native animal species ranging from wallabies and kangaroos to wombats and echidnas.

Flying foxes

A birthing colony features the Grey-headed Flying Fox (Pteropus poliocephalus) and the Black Flying-fox (Pteropus alecto), both species listed as vulnerable to extinction. At night in October through to January, mothers can be seen flying out to feed at night with their babies.

Industries

The fishing community has many commercial fishing industries, ranging from the oceangoing prawn and whiting trawlers to the river netters and trawlers. The river and beach netters can be seen hauling in mullet during the end of autumn. Iluka is also a popular recreational fishing destination.

Inside Iluka Bay is the Clarence River Fishermen's Co-op which provides a service to the commercial fishermen. The CRFC sells and transports the fresh seafood locally, regionally, nationally and globally. The Iluka Depot consists of a factory, retail shop and a chandlery shop for the fishermen and other consumers.

The town has two clubs and a public hotel, the Iluka Bowling Club, Iluka Golf Club, and Sedgers Reef Hotel. The bowling club has three bowling greens and a Chinese restaurant. The golf club has a ten-hole course and a small restaurant.

Schools

The Iluka Public School serves the area.

Sport

The Iluka Oval is positioned in the centre of town. It was originally used primarily as a cricket ground, and after Ken Leeson's help to construct another field, the oval was named the Ken Leeson Oval. It contains two cricket pitches, synthetic and turf, two tennis courts, a netball/ basketball court and a soccer/rugby union field.

Competitive sport includes cricket, 'The Cossacks' rugby union side, soccer, a netball team, and the Iluka Boardriders Club holds monthly competitions.

Newspapers

Two newspapers service the area, The Daily Examiner and The Coastal Views.

References 

Towns in New South Wales
Northern Rivers
Coastal towns in New South Wales
Clarence Valley Council